Boris Strel (20 October 1959 – 28 March 2013) was a Slovenian alpine skier. He was born in Žiri, Slovenia (then part of Yugoslavia). In December 1981, Strel took the only Slovenian top-level win in men's giant slalom in the 1982 Alpine Skiing World Cup competition in Cortina d'Ampezzo. He ended his career after the 1984/85 season due to problems with his spine and was later active as a ski school and a ski repair shop owner. Strel committed suicide on 28 March 2013.

World Cup results

Season standings

Race podiums

Olympic Games results

World Championships results

<small>From 1948 through 1980, the Winter Olympics were also the World Championships for alpine skiing.

References

External links
 
 

1959 births
2013 suicides
Slovenian male alpine skiers
Alpine skiers at the 1980 Winter Olympics
Alpine skiers at the 1984 Winter Olympics
Olympic alpine skiers of Yugoslavia
Universiade medalists in alpine skiing
People from Žiri
Universiade silver medalists for Yugoslavia
Competitors at the 1985 Winter Universiade
Suicides in Slovenia